Plop!, "The New Magazine of Weird Humor!", was a comic book anthology series published by DC Comics in the mid-1970s. It falls into the horror / humor genre. It lasted 24 issues and the series ran from Sept./Oct. 1973 to Nov./Dec. 1976.

Background and creation
According to Steve Skeates, Plop! was based around a horror / humor story he wrote called "The Poster Plague", which was published in The House of Mystery.

The title initially was intended to be called Zany. A number of the one-panel cartoons published in the comic included the visible prefix ZA, in reference to the originally intended title. Sergio Aragonés credits publisher Carmine Infantino with coming up with the final title: "Joe Orlando and I were sitting in a restaurant talking with Carmine Infantino. They wanted a magazine that was different, something about black humor. Carmine came up with the name. We were talking about it and he said, 'What will we call it?' And I said, 'We can call it anything, because if the magazine is good, then it will stay'. And he said, 'No, we can't call it, for instance...PLOP!' And I said, 'Yes, we can'. And so I started making sketches of things going PLOP! and they laughed and decided the name was good".

Contents
Each issue was centered on a frame story starring three ghoulish characters with Biblical names: Cain, Abel (previously introduced in The House of Mystery and The House of Secrets, respectively) and Eve. An issue would typically contain a story told by each of the characters, each bidding to outdo the others in fiendishness.

Stories for Plop! were generally created in one of three ways. The most common was that Steve Skeates would write the stories himself, using the full script method. Due to a brief feud with editor Joe Orlando, for a time Skeates' stories were written under the pseudonym Chester P. Hazel. The second way was using plot ideas submitted by readers of the anthology. Orlando would select which plot ideas would be used and Skeates would then write the full story. The third way was that Aragonés would write the plot, and someone else would write the script once the story was fully drawn.

An illustrative tale drawn by Berni Wrightson involved a gourmet diner whose love for frog legs leads to a predictable amphibian revenge: he is left without lower limbs and is doomed to negotiate the world on a trolley.

Basil Wolverton and Wallace Wood provided covers for the first 19 issues, each depicting a freakish character of some kind. The cover borders hosting a plethora of creatures, however, were drawn by Sergio Aragonés. All three artists worked on MAD, and the logo of Plop! is reminiscent of the early logo of that magazine. Wolverton's covers were not drawn for Plop!; they were inventory pieces which he sent to DC Comics as a general submission. When all of the drawings he submitted were found suitable for use in Plop!, Wolverton briefly came out of retirement so that he could continue drawing covers for the magazine. After he had a stroke, the magazine turned to Wood as the new cover artist.

Aragonés drew most of the frame stories. Later MAD contributor Dave Manak also did art.

The magazine was first published without ads but, when sales proved insufficient, advertisements were brought in for later issues. The magazine sold so poorly that, even with the added advertising revenue, DC Comics lost money on each issue, leading to its cancellation.

Awards
The series received a number of awards, including the Shazam Award for Best Humor Story in 1973 for "The Gourmet" in issue #1, and another nomination for the same award for "The Escape" in the same issue. Steve Skeates also won the Shazam Award for Best Writer (Humor Division) in 1973 for his work on the series. The comic was nominated for the Eagle Award for Favourite Comic (Humour) in 1977.

Collected editions 
 The Steve Ditko Omnibus Volume 1 includes Plop! #16: "Love is a Dandy!" by Steve Skeates and Steve Ditko, 480 pages, September 2011,

Notes

References

Comics magazines published in the United States
Satirical magazines published in the United States
Satirical comics
1973 comics debuts
1976 comics endings
Comics by David Michelinie
Comics by George Kashdan
Magazines established in 1973
Magazines disestablished in 1976
Defunct American comics
Bimonthly magazines published in the United States